Pristimantis atrabracus is a species of frog in the family Strabomantidae. It is endemic to Peru where it is only known from the region of its type locality near La Peca, Bagua Province, in the Amazonas Region of northern Peru.

Description
The holotype (an adult female) measured  in snout–vent length. The specific name atrabracus means "black trousers", in reference to the black ventral surfaces of the hind limbs in this species, having a resemblance of trousers.

Habitat and conservation
Its natural habitats are evergreen forests. One individual was found from a grassy bog above the tree line. The altitudinal range, based on just two localities, is  asl. Threats to this little known species are unknown but might include wood extraction.

References

atrabracus
Endemic fauna of Peru
Amphibians of Peru
Amphibians of the Andes
Frogs of South America
Amphibians described in 1999
Taxonomy articles created by Polbot